The Hirtenberg HS.9 was an Austrian two-seat touring or training aircraft of the early 1930s.

Design and development
A derivative of the Hopfner HS-5/28 via the Hopfner HS-8/29, the HS.9 was a parasol wing monoplane with a fixed tailskid landing gear and room for two occupants in tandem open cockpits, and first flew as the Hopfner HS-9/32 in 1932, powered by a de Havilland Gipsy I engine. Production versions had Siemens Sh 14 engines with NACA cowlings. A single example of a refined version with an uncowled Siemens engine was flown in 1935 as the Hopfner HS-9/35, shortly before the Hopfner company went bankrupt.

When Hopfner's assets were purchased by Otto Eberhardt Patronenfabrik, production continued of both de Havilland- and Siemens-powered aircraft under the Hirtenberg brand.

Variants
 HS-9/32 - Original version by Hopfner
 HS-9/35 - developed version of HS-9/32
 HS.9 - Production aircraft with a Siemens Sh 14a piston engine.
 HS.9A - Production aircraft with a de Havilland Gipsy Major piston engine.
 HS.16 - military trainer version of HS.9

Operators

Austrian Air Force (1927-1938)

Specifications (HS.9A)

References

Further reading
 

1930s Austrian civil utility aircraft
Hopfner aircraft
Aircraft first flown in 1932
Parasol-wing aircraft
Single-engined tractor aircraft